The 2013 Cal Poly Mustangs football team represented California Polytechnic State University in the 2013 NCAA Division I FCS football season. The Mustangs were led by fifth year head coach Tim Walsh and played their home games at Alex G. Spanos Stadium. They were members of the Big Sky Conference. They finished the season 6–6, 5–3 in Big Sky play to finish in a four-way tie for fourth place.

Schedule

Game summaries

San Diego

@ Fresno State

@ Colorado State

@ Portland State

Yale

Weber State

@ Montana

Northern Arizona

@ UC Davis

Sacramento State

Eastern Washington

@ Northern Colorado

Ranking movements

References

Cal Poly
Cal Poly Mustangs football seasons
Cal Poly Mustangs football